The Office of the President of Ukraine (formerly Administration of the President of Ukraine) is a standing advisory body set up by the President of Ukraine pursuant to clause 28, Article 106 of the Constitution of Ukraine. The duties of the Office are to provide administrative, legal, consultative, advisory, media, analytical and other assistance and support to the President when exercising authorities established by the Constitution of Ukraine.

Overview
After Ukraine declared independence in 1991, President Leonid Kravchuk established the Administration of the President on 13 December as an advisory body to the President (the Ukrainian SSR formally ceased to exist on 26 December 1991). The Administration is headquartered on 11 Bankova in Kyiv.

President Leonid Kuchma kept the name Administration for the period of his two terms in office. 

Under President Yushchenko, the administration was reorganized into the Secretariat on 24 January 2005 in accordance with Clause 28 of Article 106 of the Constitution of Ukraine. 

President Viktor Yanukovych restored the name Administration of the President of Ukraine on 25 February 2010. On 20 June 2019 President Volodymyr Zelenskyy signed a decree that transformed the Presidential Administration of Ukraine into the Office of the President of Ukraine.

The Office consists of the Head of the Office of the President of Ukraine, Deputies of the Head, Chief of Staff, First Assistant to the President, Advisors, Authorized Advisors, Press Secretary, Representatives of the President, Cabinet of the President, Cabinet of the Head of the Office, Services, Directorates, and Departments.

Heads of the Administration / Secretariat / Office

List of Chiefs-of-Staff

Structure
 Cabinet of the President of Ukraine
 Cabinet of the Head of the Office of the President of Ukraine
 State Protocol and Ceremonials Service 
 Directorate for Legal Policy 
 Directorate for Foreign Policy and Strategic Partnership
 Directorate for Justice and Law Enforcement 
 Directorate for Regional Policy
 Directorate for Economic Policy
 Directorate for National and Humanitarian Policy
 Directorate for Information and Media Policy
 Social Policy and Health Care Directorate
 European and Euro-Atlantic Integration Department
 National Security and Defense Department
 Document Control Department  
 Department for Citizenship, Pardon and State Awards
 Department for Public Queries 
 HR Department 
 Information Technologies Department 
 Department for Interaction with the Parliament and Government 
 Center for Coordination with the Cabinet of Ministers of Ukraine and the Verkhovna Rada of Ukraine
 State Administrative Department

References

External links

  
Office Management at the Official website of the President of Ukraine